Carl Martin Philpott FRCS (born June 1975) is professor of rhinology and olfactology at the University of East Anglia. He established the United Kingdom's first smell and taste clinic.

References

External links 
Carl Philpott (0000-0002-1125-3236)

Fellows of the Royal College of Surgeons
Academics of the University of East Anglia
Rhinology
Alumni of the University of Leicester
21st-century British medical doctors
British surgeons
Living people
1975 births